Kismath (from kismet) is a 2016 Indian Malayalam-language romantic drama film written and directed by debutante Shanavas K Bavakutty. The film stars Shane Nigam as Irfan and Shruthy Menon as Anita, two star-crossed lovers from different religious backgrounds (Islam and Hinduism). It is produced by Rajeev Ravi under the banner of Pattam Cinema Company, and in association with LJ Films and Akbar Travels.

The film narrates the real-life story of two young lovers from Ponnani, in Kerala - a 28-year-old scheduled caste girl and a 23-year-old Muslim boy - who faced backlash from society for their relationship in 2011. The screenplay was conceived by Bavakutty while serving as the town's Municipal Councillor.

A trailer was released on 20 July 2016. The film released on 29 July 2016. The film was a commercial success.

Cast 
 Shane Nigam as Irfan
 Shruthy Menon as Anita
 Vinay Forrt as Sub Inspector Ajay C Menon
 Alencier Ley Lopez as Sayed Bava Thangal
 Sajitha Madathil as the warden
 Surabhi Lakshmi as Saleena
 P. Balachandran as Appu Nair
 Sunil Sukhada as Assistant Sub Inspector Nair
 Anand Bal as Plaza Khaleel
 Anil Nedumangad as Mohanan
 Vijayan Karanthoor as K T
 Jayaprakash Kuloor as Aboo
 Binoy Nambala as Shihab
 Abu Salih as Irfan's friend
 Binny Tom

Soundtrack

References

External links
 

2010s Malayalam-language films
Indian romantic drama films
Films shot in Kozhikode
2016 romantic drama films
Films scored by Sushin Shyam